John Williamson "Jake" Findlay (born 13 July 1954 in Blairgowrie, Scotland) is a former 
Scottish footballer, most noted as a player for Aston Villa and Luton Town. Standing at 6ft3inch he was a commanding goalkeeper.

Playing career

Born in Blairgowrie, the big Scotsman was signed by Aston Villa a month shy of his 15th birthday.

Only making 14 appearances for Villa, he was sold to David Pleat's Luton Town in 1978 as a replacement for Milija Aleksic. He starred for Luton as they won the Second Division in 1981–82.

Findlay was constantly tipped to play for Scotland, but was never called up. Findlay fractured his thumb in 1983, and by the time he had recovered Luton had signed Les Sealey. Findlay moved on to Swindon Town in 1985, and after spells with Peterborough, Portsmouth and Coventry he retired from the game.

References

1954 births
Living people
English Football League players
Scottish footballers
Aston Villa F.C. players
Luton Town F.C. players
Barnsley F.C. players
Derby County F.C. players
Swindon Town F.C. players
Peterborough United F.C. players
Portsmouth F.C. players
Coventry City F.C. players
Association football goalkeepers
People from Blairgowrie and Rattray